The Tumarín Dam is a 60 meter tall, concrete gravity dam under construction on the Río Grande de Matagalpa, just upstream of the town of Tumarín in the South Caribbean Coast Autonomous Region, Nicaragua. Aiming at generating power, it will be the largest hydropower dam in Nicaragua and one of the largest ones in Central America when completed.

The power station located at the base of the dam will house three 84.33 MW Kaplan turbine-generators for an installed capacity of 253 MW. The dam will create a reservoir covering 40 square kilometers.

The project is being developed by Centrales Hidroelectricas de Nicaragua (CHN). Brazil's Eletrobras was to fund the US$1.1 billion under a 20 to 30 year build–operate–transfer (BOT) agreement. First announced in March 2010, preliminary construction (roads, bridges and foundation) was to begin in 2011, and operations on the plant were projected to start by February 2015, after a 4-year-long construction. However, there have been many delays. In 2016, the dam project was indefinitely suspended due to Eletrobras' economic and legal troubles, in connection with the Brazilian economic crisis. The project is still stalled as of January 2020.

References

Dams in Nicaragua
Hydroelectric power stations in Nicaragua
South Caribbean Coast Autonomous Region
Roller-compacted concrete dams
Proposed hydroelectric power stations
Proposed renewable energy power stations in Nicaragua